Marcus Watson (born September 16, 1989 in Houston, Texas) is an American soccer player currently playing for Los Angeles Misioneros in the USL Premier Development League.

Career

Youth and Amateur
Instead of attending college and playing college soccer, Watson decided to pursue a career as a professional soccer player straight out of high school; he travelled to England, and was offered a place on the academy of famed English club Leicester City. As a member of the U18 Academy team, Watson was rostered in two reserve games while with the Foxes.

Watson returned to the United States in 2008, and subsequently spent some time playing for Los Angeles-based amateur team Hollywood United.

Professional
Watson signed his first professional contract with Minnesota in April 2009, and made his professional debut on June 27, in a 3-1 defeat to the Rochester Rhinos.

He found himself without a club when the Thunder folded at the end of the 2009 USL-1 season; after a brief stint with LA-based amateur team Doxa Italia, he joined Ventura County Fusion of the USL Premier Development League for the 2010 season, before moving on to play for the Hollywood United Hitmen in the National Premier Soccer League in 2011.

After helping Hollywood to the 2011 NPSL championship game, he left the club following the conclusion of the season, and subsequently signed to play for the Los Angeles Misioneros in the USL Premier Development League in 2012.

International
Watson has played for both of the U-18 and U-20 United States national teams.

References

External links
 Minnesota Thunder bio

1989 births
Living people
American soccer players
Minnesota Thunder players
Ventura County Fusion players
LA Laguna FC players
USL First Division players
USL League Two players
Association football defenders